Breguet Glacier is a glacier flowing into Cierva Cove south of Gregory Glacier, on the west coast of Graham Land. It was shown on an Argentine government chart of 1957, and named by the UK Antarctic Place-Names Committee in 1960 for Louis Breguet and Jacques Breguet, French aircraft designers who built and flew the first helicopter to carry a man, in vertical flight.

See also 
 List of glaciers in the Antarctic
 Glaciology

External links 
 Breguet Glacier Copernix satellite image

References
 

Glaciers of Davis Coast